Eustache Le Noble (Troyes, 1643 – Paris, 31 January 1711) was a 17th-century French playwright and writer.

An attorney General at the Parlement of Metz, Le Noble led a dissipated life and after he had been condemned for having manufactured false acts, he was jailed at the Conciergerie where he fell in love with Gabrielle Perreau, la Belle Épicière, who was also imprisoned.

Having found a way to get away with her, in order to make a living, he published satirical dialogues about the time topics, in which Bayle found "infinite wit and reading." The prose is clear, incisive, and frequently cut with verses which are not without merit.

Le Noble's complete works were published in Paris, 1718, 20 vol. in-12.

Sources 
 Gustave Vapereau, Dictionnaire universel des littératures, Paris, Hachette, 1876, p. 1227

External links 
 Eustache Le Noble on wikisource
 Philippe Hourcade, Entre Pic et Rétif : Eustache Le Noble, 1643-1711, Paris, Klincksieck, 1990
 Eustache Le Noble on data.bnf.fr
 La Gage touché: histoires galantes et comiques (1761 edition) at HathiTrust
 La Gage touché: histoires galantes et comiques (1730 edition) at HathiTrust

17th-century French dramatists and playwrights
17th-century French male writers
People from Troyes
1643 births
1711 deaths